Sugar Ray is an American alternative rock band.

Sugar Ray may also refer to:

Music

 Sugar Ray (album), Sugar Ray's 2001 self-titled album
 Sugar Ray Norcia (born 1954), an American musician best known for his work with his backing band The Bluetones
 Sugaray Rayford, an American soul blues singer and songwriter

Boxing 
 Sugar Ray Robinson (1921–1989), American boxer often cited as the greatest of all time
 Sugar Ray Leonard (born 1956), American boxer declared the "Boxer of the Decade" for the 1980s
 Sugar Ray Seales (born 1952), American boxer and 1972 Olympic champion

Other 
 "Sugar" Ray Emery (1982-2018), Canadian hockey goaltender
 Sugar Ray Lloyd, another ring name of Glacier (wrestler), professional wrestler Raymond M. Lloyd (born 1964)
 Sugar Ray Marimón (born 1988), Colombian baseball pitcher
 Micheal Ray Richardson (born 1955), American former National Basketball Association player and former professional basketball head coach
 Ray Robinson (ATSIC Deputy Chairperson), Australian indigenous political leader

Lists of people by nickname